Francis Lagoria Jordan (December 5, 1897 – September 1980) was an American football player.  A native of Minneapolis, he played college football for Bucknell and Villanova and professional football in the National Football League (NFL) as a back for the Rock Island Independents in 1920 and for the Milwaukee Badgers in 1923. He appeared in four NFL games, one as a starter.

References

1897 births
1980 deaths
People from Minneapolis
Milwaukee Badgers players
Players of American football from Minnesota